Epichilo parvellus is a moth in the family Crambidae. It was described by Émile Louis Ragonot in 1889. It is found in India.

References

Crambinae
Moths described in 1889